Mulazzo is a comune (municipality) in the Province of Massa-Carrara in the Italian region Tuscany, located about  northwest of Florence and about  northwest of Massa.

Mulazzo borders the following municipalities: Calice al Cornoviglio, Filattiera, Pontremoli, Rocchetta di Vara, Tresana, Villafranca in Lunigiana, Zeri.

References